The Giant is a live album by trumpeter Dizzy Gillespie.  It was recorded in Paris, France, in 1973, and first released on the French America label.

Reception
The Allmusic review stated: "Gillespie plays well enough... Still, the edge is missing on these explorations of standards and recent originals although he is in particularly fine form on the ballads".

Track listing
 "Stella By Starlight" (Victor Young, Ned Washington) - 7:45
 "I Waited For You" (Gil Fuller, Dizzy Gillespie) - 3:50
 "The Girl of My Dreams" (Sunny Clapp) - 5:24
 "Fiesta Mo-Jo" (Gillespie) - 11:21
 "Serenity" (Kenny Drew) - 5:08

Personnel
Dizzy Gillespie - trumpet
Johnny Griffin - tenor saxophone (tracks 4 & 5)
Kenny Drew - piano
Niels-Henning Ørsted Pedersen - bass
Kenny Clarke - drums
Humberto Canto - conga drums

References 

America Records live albums
Dizzy Gillespie live albums
1973 live albums